Bend-La Pine Schools is a school district in the U.S. state of Oregon that serves the cities of Bend and La Pine in Central Oregon and the surrounding area, including Sunriver. The district has an enrollment of more than 18,000 students, and is the fifth largest in the state as of 2016.

Board 
The district's school board has seven elected members.

Board members 2021-22:
 Carrie McPherson - Zone 1 
 Marcus LeGrand - Zone 2 
 Shimiko Montgomery - Zone 3 
 Shirley Olson - Zone 4 
 Amy Tatom - Zone 5 
 Melissa Barnes Dholakia - Zone 6
 Janet Sarai Llerandi Gonzalez - Zone 7

Demographics
In the 2009 school year, the district had 709 students classified as homeless by the Department of Education, or 4.4% of students in the district. In the 2016–17 school year there are 18,034 students enrolled district-wide.

List of Teachers That Have Been Arrested in the District 
Erik Duane Ekstrom - On September 15, 2022, Ekstrom was arrested for possession of sexually explicit content containing minors and grooming g a 13-year-old. Two acts of first- and second-degree encouragement of child sexual abuse and one act of grooming a child.  Ekstrom taught music at Highland Elementary School at Kenwood, Cascade Middle School, Pacific Crest Middle School, and Summit High School.

Deborah Parker - On May 29, 2020, Parker was arrested for sex abuse charges. She had a sexual relationship with a 17-year-old. Eight acts of second-degree sex abuse charges.

Jason Brian Jackson - On June 6th, 2018, Jackson was arrested for viewing sexually explicit images of minors. At least 100 images of minors were found in his computer, and three videos containing similar content were found. He was brought into court on 24 counts of encouraging child sexual abuse.

Schools
The district has 30 schools.

Elementary schools 
 Amity Creek Magnet School - at Thompson 
 Bear Creek School 
 Buckingham School 
 Elk Meadow School 
 Ensworth School 
 High Lakes School 
 Highland Magnet School - at Kenwood 
 Juniper School 
 La Pine Elementary School 
 Lava Ridge School 
 Pine Ridge School 
 Ponderosa School 
 R.E. Jewell School
 Rosland Elementary
 Silver Rail Elementary School
 Three Rivers School 
 Westside Village School - at Kingston 
 William E. Miller School

Middle schools 
 Cascade Middle School 
 High Desert Middle School 
 La Pine Middle School 
 Pacific Crest Middle School
 Pilot Butte Middle School
 Sky View Middle School 
 REALMS - Rimrock Expeditionary Alternative Learning Middle School

High schools 
 Bend Senior High School 
 La Pine High School 
 Marshall High School 
 Mountain View High School
 Realms High School
 Summit High School
Caldera High School

See also 
 List of school districts in Oregon

References

School districts in Oregon
Education in Deschutes County, Oregon
Education in Bend, Oregon
1883 establishments in Oregon
School districts established in 1883